The 1956 Delaware Fightin' Blue Hens football team was an American football team that represented the University of Delaware as an independent during the 1956 NCAA College Division football season. In its sixth season under head coach David M. Nelson, the team compiled a 5–3–1 record and outscored opponents by a total of 151 to 108. Vincent Grande was the team captain. The team played its home games at Delaware Stadium in Newark, Delaware.

Schedule

References

Delaware
Delaware Fightin' Blue Hens football seasons
Delaware Fightin' Blue Hens football